Ingrid Schubert (7 November 1944 – 12 November 1977) was a West German terrorist and founding member of the Red Army Faction (RAF). She participated in the freeing of Andreas Baader from prison in May 1970 as well as multiple bank robberies before her arrest in October 1970.

She committed suicide in late 1977 whilst serving a 13-year prison sentence.

Life 
Schubert was the daughter of Nazi Party politician Frank Schubert. She grew up in Maroldsweisach and Koblenz and graduated with a degree in medicine from the Free University of Berlin in March 1970.

Two months after her graduation, she took part in the escape of Andreas Baader from police custody. In the summer of 1970, Schubert, as well as roughly twenty other RAF members, travelled to Jordan to undergo military training with the Palestinian militant group Fatah. Within the RAF she went by the codenames Irene and Nina. On 29 September 1970, Schubert drove the getaway car during an RAF robbery of a savings bank in Berlin. In the summer and autumn of 1970 Schubert took part in at least 2 further bank robberies. On 8 October 1970, Schubert was arrested at an apartment in Berlin along with RAF members Horst Mahler, Brigitte Asdonk and Irene Goergens.

Schubert was tried along with Mahler and Goergens; the trial began on 1 March 1971, and in April Schubert was sentenced to 13 years in prison. Between 1976 and 1977 she was imprisoned in JVA Stuttgart along with Baader, Gudrun Ensslin, Ulrike Meinhof, Jan-Carl Raspe, Irmgard Möller and Brigitte Mohnhaupt, where she took part in several hunger strikes. During the German Autumn of late 1977, second-generation members of the RAF tried in vain to break Schubert and other RAF members out of prison. After the suicide of top RAF members, including Baader and Esslin, on the night of 18 October 1977, Schubert hanged herself in her cell on 12 November 1977. Schubert was cremated on 25 November 1977, and buried in the family plot in the Koblenz main cemetery.

The murderers of Gerold von Braunmühls, members of the so-called "third generation" of the RAF, called themselves "Kommando Ingrid Schubert".

References 

1944 births
1977 suicides
Members of the Red Army Faction
1977 deaths
People who committed suicide in prison custody